Gharbar was a weekly BBC television programme for the Asian community, which aired from 1977-1987. Initially a 26-part series billed as "helping Asian families to help themselves", the programme was made permanent the following April and was aimed at Asian women. The programme generally consisted of features, a children's story and a musical item.

History
The first edition was broadcast on BBC Two on 19 October 1977 at 10:20am and was presented by Lalita Ahmed, Rajni Kaul and Nahid Niazi. When schools programming moved from BBC1 to BBC2 in September 1983, Gharbar transferred to BBC One. It continued to be broadcast on Wednesday mornings and was shown at 10:55am (10:50am from the following year), after Play School. At the start of September 1986, and ahead of the launch of the new BBC television daytime service, the programme was moved back to BBC Two. It moved to Tuesdays and was broadcast at the earlier time of 9am. It continued in this slot until the programme ended on 28 April 1987, two days after companion programme Asian Magazine ended, ahead of the start of a new English language programme for the Asian community, Network East, which launched in July 1987.

References

1977 British television series debuts
1987 British television series endings
1970s British television series
1980s British television series
BBC Television shows
Immigration to the United Kingdom
Indian diaspora in the United Kingdom
Pakistani diaspora in the United Kingdom
British Indian mass media
British Pakistani mass media